The Road River Formation is a geologic formation in Alaska. It preserves fossils dating back to the Silurian period.

See also

 List of fossiliferous stratigraphic units in Alaska
 Paleontology in Alaska

References
 

Geologic formations of Alaska
Silurian System of North America
Ordovician northern paleotropical deposits
Silurian northern paleotropical deposits
Devonian southern paleotropical deposits